JSC UEC-Perm Engines is a company based in Perm, Russia. It is part of United Engine Corporation.

Perm Engine Plant, one of the leading aircraft engine plants in the former USSR, produces a wide range of airplane and helicopter engines, as well as helicopter gearboxes, first-stage engines for the Proton rocket, and machinery for use in the consumer industries. It is collocated with Aviadvigatel (formerly known as the Soloviev Engine Design Bureau).

Current products 
 Aviadvigatel PD-12 turboshaft, an upgrade for the Mi-26, to replace the Ukrainian D-136
 Aviadvigatel PS-12
 AI-20D
 Aviadvigatel PS-30
 Aviadvigatel PD-14 turbofan, will power the Irkut MC-21
 PD-18R geared turbofan
 Aviadvigatel PD-30
 Aviadvigatel PS-90 turbofan, powers Ilyushin Il-76 variants, Ilyushin Il-96 variants, Beriev A-50, and Tupolev Tu-204/214 series.
 GP-2 (PS-90-GP-2) Gas Turbine
 GPA-5,5 (Taurus 60)
 GTE-25P (PS-90GP-25) based on PS-90 and GTA-25 unit GTU-25P Gas Turbine
 GTU-16P on basis PS-90A and GTU-12P
 GTU-12P (based on D-30 engine) and many other GTs
 D-30 variants modifications modernization
 GTU-30P 30 34 MW  GTE30, based on D-30F6 and PS-90
 GTA-14 14 MW based on Titan-130 Solar Turbines
 GTU-32P (30 40 MW) on basis D-30F6 and MS5002E (GTU32 "Ladoga" built at NZL plant Saint Petersburg)
 GTE180 GTE160 GT100 GTE65 . unit M94yu2
Building and Development
 PD-24 (around ± 240 kN)
 PD-28 (around ± 280 kN)
 PD-35 (up to 300/328 kN max 350)
 GTUs 30 and 40 MW
 Marine GTUs

Shvetsov engines 
 Shvetsov ASh-2 
 Shvetsov ASh-21
 Shvetsov ASh-62/M-62
 Shvetsov ASh-73
 Shvetsov ASh-82/M-82
 Shvetsov ASh-83
 Shvetsov ASh-84
 Shvetsov M-11
 Shvetsov M-22
 Shvetsov M-25
 Shvetsov M-63
 Shvetsov M-64
 Shvetsov M-70
 Shvetsov M-71
 Shvetsov M-72
 Shvetsov M-80
 Shvetsov M-81

Soloviev engines
 Soloviev D-20 turbofan, powered the Tupolev Tu-124
 Soloviev D-25 turboshaft, powers the Mil Mi-6, Mil Mi-10
 Soloviev D-30 turbofan, powers the Tupolev Tu-134A-3, A-5, and B, Mikoyan-Gurevich MiG-31, Ilyushin Il-62, Ilyushin Il-76 variants, Beriev A-40 and the Tupolev Tu-154

See also

UEC Saturn
Aviadvigatel
ELEMASH Machine-Building Plant

References

External links
 Official website

Aircraft engine manufacturers of Russia
Gas turbine manufacturers
Marine engine manufacturers
Companies based in Perm, Russia
United Engine Corporation
Aircraft engine manufacturers of the Soviet Union
Ministry of the Aviation Industry (Soviet Union)
Engine manufacturers of Russia